Frank Tidy (17 May 1932 – 27 January 2017) was an English cinematographer.

Life 
Born in Liverpool, Tidy initially worked in stop motion animation before beginning working as a cinematographer. Along with Roger Woodburn and Peter Biziou, he founded the company Valley Films, and would work on hundreds of commercials, many of which directed by eventual film director Ridley Scott and his brother Tony Scott. In 1977, he would serve as cinematographer on Scott's directorial debut The Duellists, for which he received a nomination for the BAFTA Award for Best Cinematography.

Tidy's filmography would eventually include Stop! Or My Mom Will Shoot, Under Siege and Chain Reaction. He was a Genie Award nominee for Best Cinematography in 1986 for the film One Magic Christmas.

Tidy died on 27 January 2017, aged 84, at a Kent nursing home following a battle with dementia.

References

External links
Frank Tidy at the Internet Movie Database

1932 births
2017 deaths
Deaths from dementia in England
English cinematographers
Film people from Liverpool